Denny Rumba (born 16 May 1985) is an Indonesian former professional footballer who plays as a full-back.

Club statistics

References

External links

1985 births
Living people
People from Semarang
Indonesian footballers
Liga 1 (Indonesia) players
PSMS Medan players
PSIS Semarang players
Indonesian Premier Division players
Association football fullbacks
Sportspeople from Central Java